The Holy Trinity Cathedral is a Roman Catholic church located in Sodo, Ethiopia.

The cathedral follows the Roman or Latin liturgical rite. As its name suggests, it was dedicated to the mystery of the Holy Trinity. The church is subject to the Apostolic Vicariate of Sodo (Vicariatus Apostolicus Soddensis ), which was inaugurated in 1982 by Pope John Paul II via the bull "compertum habentes".

The church is under the pastoral responsibility of the Bishop Tsegaye Keneni Derara.

See also
Roman Catholicism in Ethiopia
St. Anthony Cathedral, Endibir
Holy Trinity Cathedral (disambiguation)

References

Roman Catholic cathedrals in Ethiopia
Sodo